Up for Murder is a 1931 American pre-Code drama film written and directed by Monta Bell and starring Lew Ayres, Genevieve Tobin, Purnell Pratt, Richard Tucker, Frank McHugh and Frederick Burt. It was released on May 27, 1931, by Universal Pictures.

Plot

Bob Marshall gets a promotion at a newspaper thanks to his reporter pal Collins, who owed him a favor. Marshall is assigned to be society columnist Myra Deane's escort to a ball. He falls for Myra and buys her a bracelet from his meager savings.

Arriving uninvited at her luxurious apartment, Bob is shocked to discover Myra is romantically involved with William Winter, a married man who is also their boss. Bob slugs him during a quarrel. Winter's skull hits a table and he dies, but Myra lies, insisting Winter is merely unconscious, hoping to avoid a scandal. She moves the body once Bob leaves.

Bob reads about Winter's death in the paper and turns himself in to the law as the culprit. He is convicted of murder and sentenced to be executed before Myra comes forward with the truth. Bob later receives a package with the bracelet inside, along with Myra's invitation to return it to her in person.

Cast 
Lew Ayres as Robert Marshall
Genevieve Tobin as Myra Deane
Purnell Pratt as William Winter
Richard Tucker as Cyril Herk
Frank McHugh as Collins
Frederick Burt as City Editor
Dorothy Peterson as Mrs. Marshall

References

External links 
 

1931 films
American drama films
1931 drama films
Universal Pictures films
Films directed by Monta Bell
American black-and-white films
1930s English-language films
1930s American films